Daniel Brian Matthews, is an American financier and aviation/aerospace expert.

Education
During his undergraduate studies, Matthews focused on economics and business management at Lewis University.

He entered graduate studies at Loyola University in Chicago. Here, Dan attained his M.B.A. in a mere 8 months, specializing in Marketing and Business Management. He managed to do this. while working two jobs at the same time.

Ryder Systems and Truck Company
Matthews left Eastern to begin work at Ryder in 1989, also in Miami, Florida. He was appointed Director of Financial Planning and was subsequently promoted to Assistant Treasurer. After  years with Ryder, he was sought out by Northwest Airlines to return to the airline business in an effort to help turn around the financially ailing company.

Northwest Airlines
He began his work for Northwest Airlines in 1993. During Daniel's time at Northwest Airlines, the company was able to avoid liquidation via Chapter 7 bankruptcy, as well navigate Chapter 11 bankruptcy on multiple occasions via tactical restructuring programs that propelled the airline to global status. From 1998 to 2005, Dan and his team put more than $20 billion of financing commitments from third parties in place. Under his supervision, Northwest closed on acquisition and financing transactions on over 500 aircraft deliveries with the airline.  In his career, he has been a featured speaker at over 50 finance industry conferences, and as the Treasurer of Northwest he has received top airline industry financing awards including the first Airline Treasury Team of the Year Award in 2002 and the first AirFinance Lifetime Achievement Award in 2003. Even while the airline was in bankruptcy, he and his team won the North American Deal of the Year Award in 2006 for successfully leading a uniquely structured $1.2 billion bankruptcy financing that had never been done before by an airline in bankruptcy. Dan began as Assistant Treasurer and Vice President, was promoted to Treasurer and Vice President, and, shortly thereafter, Senior Vice President and Treasurer.

References

Lewis University alumni
Loyola University Chicago alumni
Living people
1954 births
Place of birth missing (living people)